Vicario is a surname. Notable people with the surname include:

Guglielmo Vicario (born 1996), Italian footballer
Leona Vicario, Mexican revolutionary
Marco Vicario, Italian film actor, screenwriter, producer and director

See also
Arantxa Sánchez Vicario, Spanish tennis player